Kalak Bisheh-ye Asad (also Romanized as Kalaḵ Bīsheh-ye Āsad) is a village in Malavi Rural District, in the Central District of Pol-e Dokhtar County, Lorestan Province, Iran. At the 2006 census, its population was 58, in 12 families.

References 

Towns and villages in Pol-e Dokhtar County